Pete Smalls Is Dead is a 2010 American comedy film directed by Alexandre Rockwell and written by Brandon Cole and Alexandre Rockwell. The film stars Mark Boone Junior, Peter Dinklage, Seymour Cassel, Todd Barry, Steve Buscemi, Rosie Perez and Tim Roth. The film was released on April 14, 2011.

Cast

Mark Boone Junior as Jack Gomes
Peter Dinklage as K.C. Munk
Seymour Cassel as Saco
Todd Barry as Bob Withers
Steve Buscemi as Bernie Lake
Rosie Perez as Julia
Tim Roth as Pete Smalls
Ritchie Coster as Hal Lazar
Lena Headey as Shannah
Michael Hitchcock as Sly 
Carol Kane as Landlady
Artin Kishani as Aram
Michael Lerner as Leonard Proval
David Proval as Nimmo
Steven Randazzo as Larson
Emily Rios as Xan
Theresa Wayman as Saskia
Cástulo Guerra as El Patron
Tony Longo as Joey Sausa
Tatyana Ali as Cocktail Waitress
Peter O'Leary as Fat Monk
Coati Mundi as Pool Band Leader

References

External links
 

2010 films
American comedy films
2010 comedy films
Films directed by Alexandre Rockwell
2010s English-language films
2010s American films